"Better Together" is a song written and performed by American singer-songwriter Jack Johnson. The first track on Johnson's third studio album, In Between Dreams (2005), it was released as a single in February 2006. The song charted at number 24 on the UK Singles Chart. In the United States, a live version from the En Concert live album was released as a single in 2009, peaking at number 23 on the Mediabase Triple A chart. It was also included in a Cuban remix of the song which was included in Rhythms del Mundo. An edited version of Better Together featuring a ukulele was included in the album, The Mango Tree.

The song samples from the Hoagy Carmichael song Heart and Soul.

The song was chosen by Rob Brydon as one of his Desert Island Discs. and sung by him while as his portrayal of Bryn in Gavin & Stacey in the second season's finale.

Charts

Certifications

References

2006 singles
2006 songs
2009 singles
Jack Johnson (musician) songs
Music videos directed by The Malloys
Song recordings produced by Mario Caldato Jr.
Songs with music by Hoagy Carmichael
Songs written by Frank Loesser
Songs written by Jack Johnson (musician)
2000s ballads